Moshoeshoe I ( – 11 March 1870) was the first king of Lesotho. He was the first son of Mokhachane, a minor chief of the Bamokoteli lineage, a branch of the Koena (crocodile) clan. In his youth, he helped his father gain power over some other smaller clans. At the age of 34 Moshoeshoe formed his own clan and became a chief. He and his followers settled at the Butha-Buthe Mountain. He  became the first and longest-serving King of Lesotho in 1822.

Early life 

Moshoeshoe was born under the name Lepoqo in the village of Menkhoaneng in the north of modern day Lesotho. The precise year of his birth remains unknown, estimates range from 1780 to 1794; 1786 being the most commonly agreed upon date. His name's literal translation is Dispute, originated from accusations of witchcraft which were levied on a man in Mekhoaneng around the time of his birth. He was the first son of Mokhachane, a minor chief of the Bamokoteli sub-clan of the Basotho people and his first wife Kholu. Kholu was the daughter of the Bafokeng clan chief Ntsukunyane and came from the area of the Butha-Buthe further north. The Bamokoteli numbered at most 4,000 people, they were an offshoot of the Koena tribe to whom they regularly paid tribute. Moshoeshoe's family lived in a small kraal near the Tlotsi stream, a tributary of the Caledon River. Little is known about his childhood, however he remained on good terms with his parents until their death. Around the age of six he began tending to the family's sheep and goats. Moshoeshoe had an older sister named MaTsouenyane as well as younger brothers named Makhabane and Posholi, and a younger sister named 'MaNtoetse. Mokhachane went on to marry over four other women and father other children. The Sotho people were keen pastoralists, cattle played a central role in their lives and a man's wealth was measured by the number of cattle he possessed.

Moshoeshoe and his agemates went to initiation school and he got the name Letlama, meaning strong bond. During his youth just after initiation, he was very brave and once organised a cattle raid against Ramonaheng and captured several herds. As was the tradition, he composed a poem praising himself where, amongst the words he used to refer to himself, said he was "like a razor which has shaved all Ramonaheng's beards", referring to his successful raid. In Sesotho language, a razor is said to make a "shoe...shoe..." sound, and after that he was affectionately called Moshoeshoe: "the shaver". He also referred himself as the person of Kali, thus showed that he was a descendant of the Great Kali or Monaheng who is said to be the ancestor of most Bakoena people in Lesotho with the exception of the senior Bamolibeli.

Moshoeshoe and his followers, mostly the Bakoena Bamokoteli, some Bafokeng from his maternal side and other relations as well as some clans including the Amazizi, established his village at Butha-Buthe, where his settlement and reign coincided with the growth in power of the well-known Zulu King, Shaka and what is now known as the 'time of troubles' (previously known as 'Difaqane'). During the early 19th century Shaka raided many smaller chiefdoms along the eastern coast of Southern Africa (modern day Kwa-Zulu Natal), incorporating parts of them into his steadily growing Zulu chiefdom. Various small clans were forced to flee the Zulu chief.  An era of great wars of calamity followed, known as the time of troubles/Difaqane. It was marked by aggression against the Sotho people by the invading Nguni clans. The attacks also forced Moshoeshoe to move his settlement to the Qiloane plateau. The name was later changed to Thaba Bosiu or "mountain at night" because it was believed to grow during the night and shrink during day. It proved to be an impassable stronghold against enemies.

By the latter part of the 19th century, Moshoeshoe established the nation of the Basotho, in Basutoland. He was popularly known as Morena e Moholo/morena oa Basotho (Great King/King of the Basotho).

Reign 

In the 1820s, the Basotho faced a number of cattle raids from the Koranna. It was during this time that they first encountered horses and guns in a combat setting. After a number of initial setbacks, the Basuto managed to either capture or acquire horses and guns of their own, and began stockpiling gunpowder. By 1843, Moshoeshoe had accumulated more horses and guns than any other chieftain in South Africa. Nevertheless, most of the guns in Basuto possession were outdated flintlocks, which had flooded the South African market after the introduction of percussion lock muskets.  In 1833, missionaries from the Paris Evangelical Missionary Society led by French missionaries Eugène Casalis and  began setting their outposts in Basuto lands following Moshoeshoe's invitation. They promoted a combination of Christianity, Western civilization, and commerce. They saw Basuto customs linked to obligatory labor and the dependence of the population on their chiefs as evil. They sought to undermine them by promoting private property, the commodization of production and closer economic ties with European settlers.

In 1843, Moshoeshoe signed a treaty with the governor of the British Cape Colony Sir George Napier, whereby the British recognized the Basuto as their allies. The Basuto were tasked with countering Boer incursions into the Cape during the course of the Great Trek, receiving an annual grant of 75 £ in money or ammunition. The Napier Treaty greatly increased Moshoeshoe's status as a leader. While it deprived him of some lands he had laid claim to, it also recognized his rule over various ethnic groups living in the region. In 1848, Cape governor Sir Harry Smith pressured Moshoeshoe into signing an agreement whereby he recognized British paramount authority over the lands north of the Orange River; while retaining his traditional rights. The agreement also envisioned the creation of an alliance between the British and the Basuto. A series of similar ambiguously worded treaties with local African tribes effectively established the Orange River Sovereignty. 

In the north-east, the Basuto and their Taung allies regularly engaged in tit for tat cattle raids against their old enemies the Batlakoa of Kgosi Sekonyela and the Koranna of Gert Taaibosch. The British Resident in the Orange River Sovereignty Major Henry Douglas Warden believed that the Basuto were more to blame for the continuous inter tribal warfare in the region. Warden began delineating borders between the various tribes in the north-east frontier, ignoring Moshoeshoe's long standing claims to several territories in the process. Moshoeshoe believed that the British had failed to protect him against Batlakoa and Boer encroachment, while many of his subjects accused him of cowardice in the face of British oppression. On 25 June 1851, Warden demanded that the Basuto restore cattle and horses to the victims of their past cattle raids. Warden had assembled a mixed force of British, Boer and African troops numbering approximately 2,500 men at Platberg. On 28 June, Warden moved his force against the Taung in an effort to seize stolen cattle. On 30 June, Warden's force was defeated by a Basuto-Taung army at the Battle of Viervoet. 

In October Moshoeshoe wrote to both Smith and Warden, explaining that he had acted in self-defense and intended to maintain cordial relations with the British. In February 1852, the British agreed to redraw the boundaries in the south-west and to cease colonial interference into inter-tribal conflicts in exchange for the restoration of the cattle the Basuto had stole since September 1850. Negotiations fell through and Smith's replacement Major-General Sir George Cathcart was waiting for the hostilities with the Xhosa to wane before launching a punitive expedition against the Basuto.

On 20 December 1852, a British expeditionary forced clashed with the Basuto in the Battle of Berea. A combination of poor British planning and determined Basuto resistance resulted in a temporary British retreat from the area. Fearing that a second British assault would result in his military defeat, Moshoeshoe sued for peace attaining favorable terms and restoring amicable relations with the British. In 1853, Moshoeshoe grew tired of Sekonyela's raiding, deciding to decisively deal with the Batlakoa. In November 1853, the Basuto army defeated the Batlakoa and their Koranna allies at the battle of Khoro-e-Betloa, subsequently seizing their stronghold of Jwalaboholo. The bulk of the Batlakoa either scattered or joined the Basuto. The British pulled out of the region in 1854, causing the formation of the Boer Orange Free State. 

In 1858, hostilities broke out between the Basuto and the Orange Free State. Inferior in both marksmanship and materiel, the Basuto suffered a series of defeats in the ensuing three wars that lasted until 1868. In 1866, the two sides signed the Treaty of Thaba Bosiu, whereby Moshoeshoe ceded most of his kingdom's arable land to the Boers. Hostilities resumed soon afterwards and the Boers began employing a scorched earth policy, leading to starvation among the Basuto. Fearing that the destruction of the Basuto people was imminent, Moshoeshoe, his sons and local missionaries began appealing to British High Commissioner for Southern Africa Sir Philip Edmond Wodehouse and the Colony of Natal for protection. Although, initially reluctant to intervene, the British were worried by the disruption in trade caused by the war and the possibility of Boer expansion to the Pondoland coast. In December 1867, the Colonial Office approved Basutoland's annexation by Natal. Distrusting the Natal administration and believing that the Cape Colony was not yet ready to absorb the new territory, Wodehouse disregarded those instructions. He blocked the supply of ammunition to the Free State and on 12 March 1868 proclaimed Basutoland to be a royal dominion. Moshoeshoe died on 11 March 1870 and was succeeded by his oldest son Letsie I.

Family and Lineage 
In 1810, Moshoeshoe married Mabela the daughter of the Bafokeng chief, Seepheephe who was chosen for him by his father. She became his senior wife assuming the name ’MaMohato with whom he had four sons and Letsie, Molapo, Masopha and Majara as well as a daughter named Mathe. Their relationship was described by visiting missionaries as deeply affectionate. ’MaMohato died in 1834 either due to complications during childbirth or due to a violent domestic argument stemming from an act of infidelity she had committed with one of Moshoeshoe's main councilors.

Moshoeshoe practiced polygamy, he had 30 wives in 1833, with the number rising to 140 in 1865. The names of 17 of them have been traced. Polygamy allowed Moshoeshoe to both forge alliances with other chiefs and increase his wealth as his subjects were expected to cultivate his wives' field per Sotho custom. Despite the presence of his other wives, he considered himself a widower following ’MaMohato's death. Only the children from his first marriage constituted the royal line of descent. Apart from ’MaMohato, only ‘Maneko a second ranking wife wielded considerable influence in the household. Similarly to the principal wife second ranking wives were women of power, who had separate houses, herds of cattle, fields and servants. Their sons were expected to take important positions in the kingdom. Moshoeshoe's third ranking wives were assigned to the houses of more senior wives where they acted as servants. Unlike more senior wives they did not cohabit with their husband and their condition bordered on slavery. Foreign visitors and Moshoeshoe's subjects were allowed to have sexual relationships with his third ranking wives, yet the children produced from such encounters were considered to be his.

Legacy 

Moshoeshoe Day is an annual national holiday in Lesotho celebrated on 11 March, the date of Moshoeshoe's death. Celebrations include the laying of wreaths on Moshoeshoe's grave at Thaba Bosiu by a delegation led by Lesotho's monarch, a celebratory parade and other entertainment activities.

The Moshoeshoe I International Airport, Lesotho's only international airport is named in his honour.

South African-made shweshwe fabric is named for King Moshoeshoe I who once received a gift of it and then popularized it throughout his realm.

See also 
 Shaka Zulu – contemporary
 Sekhukhune I King of the Bapedi

References

Sources

Further reading

1786 births
1870 deaths
Kings of Lesotho
Lesotho royalty
People from Leribe District
Basutoland people
Mfecane